Louis Piquett (September 24, 1880 – December 12, 1951) was an American lawyer notable for defending John Dillinger.  He was also a prosecutor for the city of Chicago.

Early career
Piquett was a former bartender active in Chicago Democratic politics.  He studied law in night school.  By 1915, he was chief clerk to the city prosecutor of Chicago.  In the early 1920s, he was appointed city prosecutor by Mayor William Hale Thompson. He was indicted in 1923 on corruption charges, which were subsequently dropped.

By the summer of 1923, Piquett was in private practice in Chicago.  In August 1923, for instance, he represented James J. McGrath, who owned films showing a boxing match between Tommy Gibbons and Jack Dempsey.  Piquett won a decision from the circuit court which stated that the films were neither immoral nor obscene, and enjoined the police from interfering with their exhibition.

In 1931, Piquett defended Leo Vincent Brothers against charges of murdering Chicago Tribune reporter Jake Lingle.

Defense of Dillinger
In 1934, Piquett defended Dillinger in Crown Point, Indiana.  He successfully argued that Dillinger should be allowed to appear in court free of shackles and without armed guards present. After Dillinger's dramatic pre-trial escape, an investigation by the state of Indiana revealed Piquett's complicity.

Criminal charges
In January 1935, Piquett was charged with harboring the fugitive Dillinger and of conspiring with a number of others, including two doctors, to hide Dillinger while he underwent plastic surgery.  He was acquitted after less than four hours of deliberation.  During this trial he was called "the brains of the Dillinger mob."

In May 1935, he was convicted of harboring Dillinger associate Homer Van Meter, fined $10,000, and served time in the United States Penitentiary, Leavenworth.  Piquett appealed his sentence all the way up to the Supreme Court of the United States, which denied certiorari in 1936.  He was pardoned for this crime in 1951 by President Harry Truman.

Death
He died in Chicago in 1951.

References

Lawyers from Chicago
Criminal defense lawyers
1951 deaths
Crimes in Indiana
Crimes in Chicago
Recipients of American presidential pardons
Year of birth uncertain
1880 births
20th-century American lawyers